Hobo with a Shotgun is a 2011 Canadian-American exploitation action black comedy film directed by Jason Eisener, written by John Davies, from a story by Eisener, and starring Rutger Hauer. It is based on a faux-trailer of the same title featured in the Quentin Tarantino and Robert Rodriguez film Grindhouse.

Plot 
An unnamed hobo arrives by boxcar in the city of Hope Town, its graffitied welcome sign reading "Scum Town". The city is ruled over by a crime lord named "The Drake" and his sadistic sons Ivan and Slick. The Hobo sees an amateur filmmaker shooting a Bumfights-style movie. A bloodied man named Logan, the Drake's younger brother, screams for help. The Drake and his sons arrive and label him a traitor to the townspeople before publicly decapitating him with a barbed-wire noose attached to a moving car.

Wishing to buy a lawnmower in a pawn shop, the Hobo begs for change on a sidewalk. However, after seeing a group of punks drag in a homeless man, he sneaks into the Drake's nightclub. Inside, the brothers and their henchmen torture and kill homeless people in arcade-style games. Slick begins harassing a boy named Otis, who owes him money, and Ivan snaps Otis' arm. A prostitute named Abby defends Otis. Slick prepares to kill her, but the Hobo knocks him unconscious and carries him to the police station. There, he learns of the police chief's corruption and complicity in criminal activities. The brothers and chief carve "scum" into his chest and throw him into a garbage bin. He meets Abby, who helps him recover.

The next day, the Hobo goes to the filmmaker and completes a series of degrading acts, including chewing glass, to get enough money to buy the lawn mower. After getting his money and entering the pawn shop, a trio of robbers enter and hold a woman and her baby hostage. The Hobo grabs a shotgun from the shelf and kills the robbers. Realizing that Hope Town needs justice, he buys the shotgun and proceeds to kill dozens of criminals, including the filmmaker, a pimp, a coke lord, and a pedophile dressed as Santa Claus.

The Drake, infuriated, lets his sons loose. They enter a school bus and kill the fourteen children inside (who were friendly to hobos) with a flamethrower and burst into a television station to kill the anchorman during a live broadcast for expressing his appreciation of the hobo. They demand that all homeless people be killed and a mass killing of the town's homeless is launched. The Drake then joins them and orders the Hobo be brought to him.

As Abby is walking home, a cop attempts to rape her. The Hobo kills him and Abby smuggles the Hobo past a group in a shopping cart covered with the cop's remains. The pair are spotted by Otis, who informs Slick and Ivan. Back at her apartment, the Hobo tells Abby of his plan to start a lawnmowing business, which she enthusiastically supports. Ivan and Slick enter and attack the two, wounding Abby. The Hobo overpowers Slick, holds him at gunpoint, and forces Ivan to leave. The Hobo then shoots Slick in the groin and takes Abby to the hospital. Slick manages to call the Drake before he is taken to hell in a burning school bus. The Drake, mourning the death of his favorite son, summons "The Plague", a duo of armor-clad demons named Rip and Grinder. While Abby is recovering, the Hobo visits the maternity ward and delivers a monologue to the babies. The Plague slaughter all staff who make assistance for the hobo. When he returns to Abby's room, the Plague capture and deliver him to the Drake, who plans to publicly execute him.

Recovered, Abby returns to the pawn shop for weapons. Attaching an axe to the Hobo's shotgun and retrofitting the lawnmower into a shield, she arms a crowd to free the Hobo and bring down the Drake. She confronts the Drake, holding Ivan hostage; the Drake shoots and denounces him a disappointment. In the ensuing fight, Abby kills Grinder. Although the Drake severs Abby's hand with the lawnmower shield, she stabs him repeatedly with her exposed arm bone and incapacitates him. Rip tries to persuade Abby to be his partner, but the Hobo drives him off.

The townspeople, motivated by Abby's bravery, show up with their own weapons and proceed to aim them at the shocked police, who demand that they leave the area. Seeing that the police will kill the people they failed to protect against the criminals, the Hobo tells the Drake that on their upcoming ride to Hell "You're riding shotgun," and blows his head off. The police shoot the Hobo, and the people avenge him and turn their guns on the police. Both groups shoot each other, while the Hobo dies and Abby's screams are heard. The corrupt police are killed and the Drake's influence in the town comes to an end.

Alternative ending 
In an extended ending that was taken out from the final cut of the film, Abby's hand is replaced by a gatling-style shotgun as she becomes a new member of the Plague.

Cast 
 Rutger Hauer as The Hobo, a homeless man who becomes a vigilante after witnessing Hope Town's high crime rate and corrupt, ineffective police.
 Molly Dunsworth as Abby, a local prostitute who befriends the Hobo, she became at first horrified by his actions then after watching his bravery decides to help him.
 Brian Downey as "The Drake", a ruthless psychopathic crime lord of Hope Town, the father of Ivan and Slick. 
 Gregory Smith as "Slick", Drake's favorite son and Ivan's brother. Slick is a highly remorseless, sadistic, and cold killer. His father prefers him over Ivan due to his intelligence and leadership skills.
 Nick Bateman as Ivan, Drake's son and Slick's equally sadistic brother.
 Nick Bateman and Peter Simas as Rip and Grinder, known as The Plague two armored demons who seem to be contract killers with a hit list of historical and Biblical figures such as Abraham Lincoln and Jesus Christ.
 Robb Wells as Logan, Drake's brother and a traitor for hobos
 Jeremy Akerman as The Chief of Police
 David Brunt as Corrupt Police Officer
 Pasha Ebrahimi as The "Bumfights" director
 George Stroumboulopoulos as The News Anchor

Development 
Hobo with a Shotgun, directed by Jason Eisener, was initially a fake trailer made for an international contest to promote the release of Quentin Tarantino and Robert Rodriguez's double feature Grindhouse. It won the contest, and was screened in some areas of Canada as part of the actual release of Grindhouse. A feature-length version of Hobo With a Shotgun began principal photography in Halifax on April 19, 2010.

A teaser trailer (including behind-the-scenes and test footage) was released on April 26, 2010. David Brunt, who played the homeless man in the trailer, cameos in the film as a cop. It was the second of Grindhouses fake trailers to be turned into a feature film, the first being Machete.

The opening theme music was borrowed from the exploitation film Mark of the Devil. The song "Run with Us", performed by Lisa Lougheed, from the 1980s animated series The Raccoons, is played in the end credits.

Release 
Hobo with a Shotgun had a world premiere at the 2011 Sundance Film Festival. The film was released on a limited basis to Canadian theatres on March 25, 2011, and American ones on May 6, 2011. The film was also released via OnDemand services such as Xbox Live, PlayStation Network, and iTunes on April 1, 2011.

Home media 
The film received its Australian premiere on the opening night of the Sydney Film Festival on June 8, 2011. It was later released on DVD and Blu-ray Disc in the United States on July 5, 2011 and in the UK on July 15, 2011.

Reception 
Reviews of the film upon its release were generally mixed-to-positive, and it currently holds a 66% approval rating out of 119 reviews on the review aggregate website Rotten Tomatoes with an average rating of 5.7 out of 10 and with the consensus being, "It certainly isn't subtle – or even terribly smart – but as a gleefully gory homage to low-budget exploitation thrillers, Hobo with a Shotgun packs plenty of firepower." In his review for National Public Radio, Scott Tobias wrote "There's something pure about the crude pleasures of Hobo with a Shotgun, a pre-fab cult film that aspires to nothing more (or less) than the red-meat feeding of a feral midnight-movie audience", and that the film is "just raw sensation, built on a series of shocks that keep topping themselves for cartoonish grotesquerie". Writing in Film Journal International, Maitland McDonagh described the film as "a pitch-perfect recreation of the brutal, low-budget crime films of the 70s, which is simultaneously the best and the worst thing about it". In his negative review of the film Ty Burr wrote in The Boston Globe that although it "revels in the trash aesthetic of ’70s trash cinema, from its over-saturated colors to its intentionally bad acting", the film "illustrates a modern B-movie principle: If you set out to parody junk, you will more than likely end up with junk".

References

External links 
 
 
 

2011 films
2011 action thriller films
American action thriller films
Canadian action thriller films
American dystopian films
English-language Canadian films
American exploitation films
Features based on short films
Film spin-offs
Films about homelessness
Films shot in Nova Scotia
Grindhouse (film)
American splatter films
Canadian splatter films
American vigilante films
Canadian vigilante films
Canadian exploitation films
2010s English-language films
2010s American films
2010s Canadian films
2010s vigilante films